Homolycorine is one of a number of toxic alkaloids found in various Amaryllidaceae species such as daffodils (Narcissus).

Sources 
 Four new Amaryllidaceae alkaloids from Zephyranthes candida. Shitara N,  Hirasawa Y,  Hasumi S,  Sasaki T,  Matsumoto M,  Wong CP,  Kaneda T,  Asakawa Y,  Morita H  (2014 Jul) Journal of natural medicines, 68(3):610-4
 Acta Crystallographica
 T. Kitagawa, W. I. Taylor, S. Uyeo and H. Yajima. The constitution of homolycorine and lycorenine J. Chem. Soc., 1955, 1066-1068 DOI:  10.1039/JR9550001066
 

Lactones
Alkaloids
Dihydroisocoumarins